Praskoveyevka or Praskoveevka is a village near Gelendzhik in Krasnodar Krai, in the south of Russia. It is situated on the northeastern beach of the Black Sea, 17 km southeast of Gelendzhik and 89 km southwest of Krasnodar. It had 269 inhabitants as of 2010.

It is in the municipality Divnomorski.

History 
The town was founded in 1866 with Pontic Greek settlers.

Places of interest 
North of the coast of Praskoveyevka is the Sail Rock, a natural monument consisting of vertical rock that is 25 meters high, 20 meters long and 1 meter thick, and that stands on the coast of the Black Sea. In the vicinity of the locality, Vladimir Putin has built a luxurious mansion, known as Putin's Palace.

References

External links 
 This article contains geographical data extracted from Google Earth and the map of Russia at Yandex.ru, accessible at this link.
 This article is a translation of the corresponding article in the Russian Wikipedia, Прасковеевка.
 Topographical map at maps.vlasenko.net.
 About the palace (in Russian) 

1866 establishments in the Russian Empire
Populated places established in 1866
Rural localities in Krasnodar Krai